Martin Mullis (born 31 August 1957) is a Swiss former footballer who played in the late 1970s and 1980s, mainly as a forward but also as a midfielder.

Football career
Mullis first played for St. Gallen and joined Basel's first team in for their 1979–80 season under manager Helmut Benthaus. Mullis played his domestic league debut for his new club in the home game on 13 September 1980 in the St. Jakob Stadium as Basel won 1–0 against hia former club St. Gallen. He was substituted in at half time for the injured Jörg Stohler. He scored his first goal for the club on 27 September in the Swiss Cup away game against Fribourg as Basel won 3–0. He scored his first league goal for his club on 8 March 1981 in the away game as Basel drew 2–2 with Chênois.

Staying with the club for two seasons Mullis played a total of 76 games for Basel scoring a total of 10 goals. 43 of these games were in the Nationalliga A, five in the Swiss Cup and Swiss League Cup, five in the Cup of the Alps and 51 were friendly games. He scored five goals in the domestic league, one in the Swiss Cup, two in the Cup of the Alps and the other five were scored during the test games.

After his time in Basel Mullis moved on to play one season for Baden in the Nationalliga B, second tier of Swiss football. Then he moved on again and played two seasons for Wettingen in the Nationalliga A.

Private life
Martin Mullis was born and grew up in Bad Ragaz. He is single and has two daughters. Since 2014 he is the owner of Restaurant Central in the center of the town of his birth.

References

Sources
 Die ersten 125 Jahre. Publisher: Josef Zindel im Friedrich Reinhardt Verlag, Basel. 
 Verein "Basler Fussballarchiv" Homepage

External links
 Restaurant Central online

FC St. Gallen players
FC Basel players
FC Baden players
FC Wettingen players
Swiss men's footballers
Association football forwards
1957 births
Living people